Brenthia leucatoma is a species of moth of the family Choreutidae. It is found in Ethiopia and South Africa.

References

Brenthia
Moths of Africa
Insects of Ethiopia